Kearton is a hamlet in the Yorkshire Dales, North Yorkshire, England.

Notable people with the surname Kearton include:
Ada Cherry Kearton (1877–1966), South African soprano, spouse of Cherry Kearton
Frank Kearton, Baron Kearton (1911–1992), British scientist and industrialist
Jason Kearton (born 1969), Australian association football goalkeeper
Richard and Cherry Kearton (1862–1928), late 19th/early 20th-century wildlife photographers and naturalists

First name
Kearton Coates (1820–1893), English-born member of the Wisconsin State Assembly